Xin Zhou (Chinese: 周欣) is a Chinese scientist specializing in magnetic resonance imaging. He is currently serving as president of the Innovation Academy for Precision Measurement Science and Technology of the Chinese Academy of Sciences since July 2022.

Education 
Zhou obtained his Ph.D. degree in magnetic resonance imaging from Wuhan Institute of Physics and Mathematics, Chinese Academy of Sciences (WIPM, CAS) in 2004. He then finished his post-doctoral training in department of Radiology at Brigham and Women's Hospital, Harvard Medical School between 2005-2007. He joined the University of California Berkeley & Lawrence Berkeley National Laboratory as a research fellow between 2007-2009.

Career 
Zhou has experience in magnetic resonance imaging (MRI) and spectroscopy, focusing on ultrasensitive MRI instruments, techniques, and biosensors for medical imaging. He developed the clinically approved Human Lung Gas MRI Instrument, which was applied in the Jinyintan Hospital (Wuhan, China) and the Tongji Hospital for evaluating pulmonary injuries caused by viruses in discharged patients. He also developed multi-nuclei MRI technologies and high sensitivity MRI contrast agents, which are expected to assist with research on lung and brain diseases.

Honors 
Zhou was awarded Top Ten National Science and Technology Innovative Person(2018), the first XPLORER PRIZE(2019), the National Innovation Award(2020) and Top Ten Annual Innovative Person, CAS(2021)

References

External links 

 

 Lab website

Year of birth missing (living people)
Living people